Elizabeth Hannah Dennehy is an American television and film actress, who has appeared in such television series as Guiding Light, Seinfeld, Charmed, and Without a Trace, and films such as Clear and Present Danger, Gattaca, Soldier, and Red Dragon.

Early life, family and education

Dennehy is the daughter of actor Brian Dennehy. She obtained her acting courses from the London Academy of Music and Dramatic Art.

Career
Dennehy's career began in 1988 when she appeared as Christina "Blake" Lindsey in the TV series drama Guiding Light. She appeared in the series Star Trek: The Next Generation in the two-part episode "The Best of Both Worlds" as Lt. Commander Shelby. In 2017, Den of Geek ranked Dennehy's role as Lt. Commander Shelby as one of the top ten guest star roles on Star Trek: The Next Generation.

She has also appeared on the stage, such as playing Stella Kowalski in the 1994 production of A Streetcar Named Desire and playing Donna Marsala in, as well as co-creating, the environmental and immersive theater production Tony n' Tina's Wedding.

Filmography

References

External links

Actresses from North Carolina
American film actresses
American people of Irish descent
American television actresses
Hofstra University alumni
Living people
21st-century American women
Year of birth missing (living people)